Zombie Dogs  is a 2004 Singaporean mockumentary film directed by Toh Hai Leong. It criticises aspects of Singaporean life.

Plot
A film director films a snuff film, airing his grievances about being a Singaporean in the process.

Cast
 Toh Hai Leong as himself

Release
The film premiered on 30 April 2004 in the Singapore History Museum as part of the Singapore International Film Festival.

Reception
Tay Yek Keak of The Straits Times gave the film four stars out of five, calling it "a surprisingly good part-documentary, part-film piece of work that starts out looking like an indictment of Singapore's artless soul but ends up harbouring the sad story of a man living on the margin of society."

References

External links
 

2004 films
Singaporean comedy films
2000s English-language films
Singaporean documentary films
Mockumentary films